Nymphargus phenax is a species of frog in the family Centrolenidae, formerly placed in Cochranella.
It is endemic to Peru.
Its natural habitats are subtropical or tropical moist montane forests and rivers.

References

phenax
Amphibians of Peru
Taxonomy articles created by Polbot
Amphibians described in 1982